1743 Schmidt, provisional designation , is a dark background asteroid from the inner regions of the asteroid belt, approximately  in diameter. It was discovered during the Palomar–Leiden survey on 24 September 1960, by astronomers Ingrid and Cornelis van Houten at Leiden, on photographic plates taken by Tom Gehrels at Palomar Observatory in California. The C-type asteroid has a rotation period of 17.5 hours. It was named for the optician Bernhard Schmidt.

Orbit and classification 

Schmidt is a non-family asteroid from the main belt's background population. As it is located in the dynamical region of the Vesta family, the asteroid is potentially a Vestian interloper due to its completely different spectral type. It orbits the Sun in the inner asteroid belt at a distance of 2.1–2.8 AU once every 3 years and 11 months (1,421 days; semi-major axis of 2.47 AU). Its orbit has an eccentricity of 0.13 and an inclination of 6° with respect to the ecliptic.

Palomar–Leiden survey 

The survey designation "P-L" stands for "Palomar–Leiden", named after the Palomar and Leiden Observatory, which collaborated on the fruitful Palomar–Leiden survey in the 1960s. Gehrels used Palomar's Samuel Oschin telescope (also known as the 48-inch Schmidt Telescope), and shipped the photographic plates to Ingrid and Cornelis van Houten at Leiden Observatory where astrometry was carried out. The trio are credited with the discovery of several thousand asteroid discoveries.

Naming 

This minor planet was named after Baltic German optician and astronomer Bernhard Schmidt (1879–1935), who invented the Schmidt camera, a telescope design with a spherical primary mirror and an aspherical correcting lens, providing a wide field of view with little optical aberrations. Proposed by Paul Herget, the asteroid's official  was published by the Minor Planet Center on 15 August 1970.

Physical characteristics 

Schmidt is a common carbonaceous C-type asteroid as determined during the first phase of the Small Main-Belt Asteroid Spectroscopic Survey.

Rotation period and poles 

In September 1983, a rotational lightcurve of Schmidt was obtained from photometric observations by Richard Binzel. Lightcurve analysis gave a rotation period of  hours with a brightness amplitude of 0.36 magnitude. A modeled lightcurve using photometric data from the Lowell Photometric Database was published in 2016. It gave a concurring period of  hours, as well as two spin axes at (69.0°, −62.0°) and (261.0°, −53.0°) in ecliptic coordinates (λ, β).

Diameter and albedo 

According to the surveys carried out by the Infrared Astronomical Satellite IRAS, the Japanese Akari satellite and the NEOWISE mission of NASA's Wide-field Infrared Survey Explorer, Schmidt measures between 17.00 and 20.78 kilometers in diameter and its surface has an albedo between 0.042 and 0.0603.

The Collaborative Asteroid Lightcurve Link adopts the results obtained by IRAS, that is, an albedo of 0.0603 and a diameter of 17.28 kilometers based on an absolute magnitude of 12.48.

References

External links 
 Biography – Bernhard Schmidt
 Asteroid Lightcurve Database (LCDB), query form (info )
 Dictionary of Minor Planet Names, Google books
 Asteroids and comets rotation curves, CdR – Observatoire de Genève, Raoul Behrend
 Discovery Circumstances: Numbered Minor Planets (1)-(5000) – Minor Planet Center
 
 

001743
Discoveries by Cornelis Johannes van Houten
Discoveries by Ingrid van Houten-Groeneveld
Discoveries by Tom Gehrels
4109
Named minor planets
19600924